Weird Nature is a 2002 British documentary television series produced by John Downer Productions for the BBC and Discovery Channel. The series features strange behavior in nature—specifically, the animal world. The series now airs on the Science Channel. The series took three years to make and a new filming technique was used to show animal movements in 3D.

Each episode, however, tended to end with a piece about how humans are probably the oddest species of all. For example, in the end of the episode about locomotion, the narrator states how unusual it is for a mammal to be bipedal. In the episode about defences, the narrator explains that humans have no real natural defences, save for their big brains.

Episodes

Series 1 (2002)

References

External links
 
 
 Weird Nature at John Downer Productions

2002 British television series debuts
2002 British television series endings
Ethology
BBC television documentaries
Discovery Channel original programming
Science Channel original programming
Nature educational television series